Julio Gómez or Gomez may refer to:

 Julio Gómez (composer) (1886–1973), Spanish composer
 Julio Gómez (Spanish runner) (born 1931), Spanish Olympic athlete
 Julio César Gómez (born 1940), Uruguayan basketball player
 Julio Gómez (boxer) (born 1959), retired Spanish boxer
 Julio Gómez (footballer, born 1954), Guatemalan footballer
 Julio Gomez (businessman) (born 1960), Cuban born American businessman
 Julio Gómez (Argentine runner) (born 1963), Argentine Olympic athlete
 Julio Gómez (footballer, born 1994), Mexican footballer